G antigen 2A is a protein that in humans is encoded by the GAGE2A gene.

References

Further reading